Graeme Andrew Hallas (born 27 February 1971) is an English former professional rugby league footballer who played in the 1980s, 1990s and 2000s, and coached in the 2000s.

Background
Graeme Hallas was born in Leeds, West Riding of Yorkshire, England.

Playing career
Hallas began his amateur career with Dudley Hill ARLFC. He played for Hull Kingston Rovers, and was signed by Halifax in October 1992 in exchange for Rob Hutchinson and a fee of £70,000. He also played in the Super League for Hull F.C. and the Huddersfield Giants.

Despite Huddersfield Giants being relegated from the Super League in 2001, Hallas opted to stay with the club and signed a new contract. In 2002, Hallas played in Huddersfield Giants' victory over Leigh Centurions in the Northern Ford Premiership Grand Final. He left the club at the end of the season and joined the newly formed York City Knights. He appeared 22 times for the club in the 2003 season, scoring nine tries.

International honours
Hallas was selected for the 1992 Great Britain Lions tour of Australia and New Zealand.

Coaching career
Hallas was appointed as head coach at Hunslet Hawks. He resigned in July 2009.

References

External links
Hull KR hit by injuries
Giants loom large
Giants lead the way
Town sunk by last-gasp Walker
Huddersfield destroy Leigh
Giants cruise to Buddies triumph
Giants on course for Super League
Beware the rampaging Bulls

1971 births
Living people
English rugby league coaches
English rugby league players
Great Britain national rugby league team players
Halifax R.L.F.C. players
Huddersfield Giants players
Hull F.C. players
Hull Kingston Rovers players
Hunslet R.L.F.C. coaches
Hunslet R.L.F.C. players
Keighley Cougars players
Rugby league centres
Rugby league locks
Rugby league players from Leeds
Rugby league wingers
York City Knights players